Émilie Le Pennec  (born 31 December 1987) is a French retired artistic gymnast. Le Pennec was the 2004 Olympic Champion on the uneven bars and was the first female French gymnast to win an Olympic medal in women's artistic gymnastics.

Career
Le Pennec was born in La Garenne-Colombes, Hauts-de-Seine. Coached by Yves Kieffer at Pôle France INSEP in Paris, she was the French junior national champion in 2002. At her first senior nationals in 2003, she came fifth, but won a silver medal in her specialty, the uneven bars. She represented France at the 2002 Junior European Championships, where she won a bronze medal in the team event. At the 2003 World Gymnastics Championships, Le Pennec was a member of the 10th-place French team. She also qualified for the all-around and the floor exercise finals, where she finished 11th and seventh, respectively.

At the 2004 Olympics in Athens, Le Pennec placed sixth with the French team and 14th in the all-around final. However, she shone in the uneven bars event final, where her challenging routine helped her win a gold medal over a tough field with numerous Olympic and world champions, including Svetlana Khorkina (who took an infamous fall from the apparatus, which she traditionally dominated) and 2002 World Champion Courtney Kupets. Her medal marked the first ever for a French female gymnast.

Le Pennec continued to train and compete after the Olympics. In 2005, she earned two medals at the European Championships: gold on uneven bars and bronze on floor. She also qualified to the all-around finals in first place, but lost any chance for a medal when she fell during her balance beam routine. Le Pennec also competed in the 2005 World Championships in Melbourne, but mistakes prevented her from medalling.

One of Le Pennec's competitive uneven bars routine was considered to be one of the most technically difficult in the world. In it, she completed a Def (a Gienger release move with a full twist), an element classified at the top difficulty level, Super-E, in the 2005 Code of Points. Le Pennec also performed a double-twisting double back tuck salto dismount.

Le Pennec missed the 2006 European Championships to concentrate on schoolwork. Later, recuperating from an Achilles' tendon injury and acting on the advice of her doctors, she sat out of the 2006 World Championships.

On 27 September 2007, she announced via a press release that she had put an end to her career, mainly after failing to retrieve her level after her multiple injuries in 2006–2007, the latest being a heel injury contracted during the Vittel international match in August 2007.

Olympic Bars Routine: Jump to the low bar immediately to the high bar; hop with full turn; Def (Gienger with 1.5 turn); full pirouette into overshoot to handstand down to the low bar into toe shoot to high bar; double-twisting double back tuck somersault. (S.V: 10.0)

Later life 

During the 2008 Summer Olympics, she worked as a consultant for the French TV Canal+.

After she retired from gymnastics, Le Pennec studied to become a physical therapist. She practices in Paris.

See also

List of Olympic female gymnasts for France

References

External links
 
 

1987 births
Living people
People from La Garenne-Colombes
French female artistic gymnasts
Olympic gymnasts of France
Olympic gold medalists for France
Olympic medalists in gymnastics
Gymnasts at the 2004 Summer Olympics
Medalists at the 2004 Summer Olympics
European champions for France
Mediterranean Games silver medalists for France
Mediterranean Games bronze medalists for France
Competitors at the 2005 Mediterranean Games
Sportspeople from Hauts-de-Seine
Mediterranean Games medalists in gymnastics
European champions in gymnastics
21st-century French women